40 Leonis is a star in the zodiac constellation of Leo. It is faintly visible to the naked eye, having an apparent visual magnitude of 4.80. An annual parallax shift of 46.80 mas, as seen from Earth's orbit, yields a distance estimate of 69.7 light years. It is moving away from the Sun with a radial velocity of 5.9 km/s and has a relatively high proper motion, traversing the sky at the rate of 0.315 arcseconds per year.

This is an F-type star with a stellar classification of F6 IV-V, which indicates the spectrum shows traits of both a main sequence star and a more evolved subgiant star. It is a suspected Delta Scuti variable and shows a depleted lithium abundance. The star is about 2.6 billion years old with a relatively high rate of spin for its age, showing a projected rotational velocity of about 17 km/s. It has 1.35 times the mass of the Sun and 1.68 times the Sun's radius. 40 Leonis is radiating around 4.4 times the Sun's luminosity from its photosphere at an effective temperature of roughly 6,450 K.

An X-ray emission with a luminosity of  has been detected from this position, which may be coming from an undetected short-period, low mass companion. 40 Leonis has a common proper motion companion, NLTT 23781, with a wide angular separation of 5,230″ (1.453°), corresponding to a physical separation of at least . This magnitude 16.48 star has a class of M5 and is overluminous for its type, which may mean it is a binary system.

References

F-type main-sequence stars
F-type subgiants
Delta Scuti variables
Leo (constellation)
Durchmusterung objects
Leonis, 40
Gliese and GJ objects
089449
050564
4054